The 1985 season was the Minnesota Vikings' 25th in the National Football League. Under returning head coach Bud Grant, they finished with a 7–9 record and missed the playoffs for a third season in a row. At the end of the season, Grant retired for good after 18 years with the franchise.

Offseason

1985 Draft

 In an attempt to draft QB Bernie Kosar, the Vikings traded their first-round selection (3rd overall) and a provisional second-round selection (30th overall) to the Houston Oilers in exchange for Houston's first-round selection (2nd overall).
 When Kosar did not declare for the draft and instead controversially waited for the supplemental draft, the traded the first-round selection they received from the Oilers to the Atlanta Falcons in exchange for Atlanta's first- and third-round selections (4th and 60th overall).
 As part of the trade between the Vikings and Oilers, the Vikings agreed not to draft DE Ray Childress or trade the pick to a team that would draft Childress. Houston drafted Childress with the 3rd overall pick and this provisional selection was returned to Minnesota.
 The Vikings traded CB John Turner to the San Diego Chargers in exchange for San Diego's third-round selection (66th overall).
 The Vikings traded QB Steve Dils to the Los Angeles Rams in exchange for the Rams' fourth-round selection (106th overall).
 The Vikings traded LB Brad Van Pelt to the Los Angeles Raiders in exchange for the Raiders' sixth-round selection (164th overall) and 1986 second-round selection.
 The Vikings traded their seventh-round selection (171st overall) to the Green Bay Packers in exchange for K Jan Stenerud.

Preseason

Regular season

Schedule

Standings

Personnel

Staff

Roster

Statistics

Team leaders

League rankings

25-year team
The team recognized an all-time team in 1985 as part of the celebration of the 25th season.
Offense
WRs: Ahmad Rashad, Sammy White
T: Ron Yary, Grady Alderman
G: Ed White, Milt Sunde
C: Mick Tingelhoff
TE: Stu Voigt
QB: Fran Tarkenton
RB: Bill Brown, Chuck Foreman
K: Fred Cox
Defense
DE: Jim Marshall, Carl Eller
DT: Alan Page, Gary Larsen
OLB: Matt Blair, Roy Winston
ILB: Jeff Siemon, Scott Studwell
S: Paul Krause, Karl Kassulke
CB: Bobby Bryant, Ed Sharockman
P: Greg Coleman
Head coach: Bud Grant

References

1985
Minnesota
Minnesota Vikings